Events from the year 1750 in Wales.

Incumbents
Lord Lieutenant of North Wales (Lord Lieutenant of Anglesey, Caernarvonshire, Flintshire, Merionethshire, Montgomeryshire) – George Cholmondeley, 3rd Earl of Cholmondeley 
Lord Lieutenant of Glamorgan – Charles Powlett, 3rd Duke of Bolton
Lord Lieutenant of Brecknockshire and Lord Lieutenant of Monmouthshire – Thomas Morgan
Lord Lieutenant of Cardiganshire – Wilmot Vaughan, 3rd Viscount Lisburne
Lord Lieutenant of Carmarthenshire – vacant until 1755
Lord Lieutenant of Denbighshire – Richard Myddelton
Lord Lieutenant of Pembrokeshire – Sir Arthur Owen, 3rd Baronet
Lord Lieutenant of Radnorshire – William Perry

Bishop of Bangor – Zachary Pearce
Bishop of Llandaff – Edward Cresset
Bishop of St Asaph – Robert Hay Drummond
Bishop of St Davids – The Hon. Richard Trevor

Events
9 January – At the age of 25, Henry Herbert the younger succeeds to his father's earldom of Pembroke.
"Disruption of 1750": Howell Harris and Daniel Rowland quarrel, resulting in a lasting split in the Welsh Methodist movement.
William Thomas begins his diary.

Arts and literature

New books

English language
Griffith Hughes - Natural History of Barbados

Welsh language
David Jones - Egluryn Rhyfedd
Daniel Rowland - Ymddiddan rhwng Methodist Uniawngred ac un Cyfeiliornus

Births
June - William Morgan, actuary (died 1833)
14 November - Edward Williams, clergyman and academic (died 1813)
11 December - Isaac Shelby, Welsh-descended American politician (born in US; died 1826)
unknown date - Evan Davies, Independent minister (died 1806)

Deaths
9 January - Henry Herbert, 9th Earl of Pembroke, 56
May - Sir Samuel Pennant, Lord Mayor of London
22 May - Matthew Pritchard, Roman Catholic bishop, 81
29 November - Bussy Mansel, 4th Baron Mansel

References

1750 by country
1750 in Great Britain